Peter Lichtner-Hoyer (28 December 1925 – 23 November 2020) was an Austrian sportsman and colonel.

Career 
During World War II, he was badly wounded, so the physicians thought he would never walk again.  Nevertheless, he regained strength and took part in more than 1500 competitions as an equestrian and as a pentathlete and reached 1200 good placements. Lichtner-Hoyer took part in 24 world and European Championships.

Olympic Games 
 1956 Summer Olympics in show jumping
 1960 Summer Olympics in pentathlon

Prizes 
 2010 Panathlon Würdigungspreis

Works 
 1985 Cavalletti-Training, Rüschlikon-Zürich : Müller
 1989 Der letzte Husar, Wien : J und V
 1998 Cavalletti-Arbeit, Lüneburg : Cadmos

References

External links 
Biography of Peter Lichtner-Hoyer 

1925 births
2020 deaths
Equestrians at the 1956 Summer Olympics
Modern pentathletes at the 1960 Summer Olympics
Austrian show jumping riders
Austrian male modern pentathletes
Austrian military personnel of World War II
Austrian soldiers
Olympic equestrians of Austria
Austrian male equestrians
Olympic modern pentathletes of Austria